Iglesia de Santa María (Oviedo) is a defunct church in Oviedo, Asturias, Spain. The church had three altars, the major one dedicated to the Virgin Mary and the two minors dedicated to San Esteban and San Julián.

See also
Asturian art
Catholic Church in Spain
Churches in Asturias
List of oldest church buildings

References

Former churches in Spain
Roman Catholic churches in Oviedo